Constantin Esarcu (November 5, 1836 – June 8, 1898) was a naturalist, physician, teacher, politician and diplomat who served as the Minister of Foreign Affairs of Kingdom of Romania from February 21 until November 26, 1891.

Esarcu graduated from a university in Bucharest and Sorbonne University in Paris. In 1864, he received his doctoral degree in medicine. He also served as the Romanian ambassador to France. In 1884, he was elected a corresponding member of the Romanian Academy.

He died on June 8, 1898, in Govora, Mihăești, Vâlcea.

See also
Foreign relations of Romania

References

Romanian Ministers of Foreign Affairs
1836 births
1898 deaths
Ambassadors of Romania to France
Corresponding members of the Romanian Academy